This page lists the results of all of the Rio Carnival in the year 2010.

Grupo Especial

Grupo A

Grupo Rio de Janeiro 1

Grupo Rio de Janeiro 2

Grupo Rio de Janeiro 3

Grupo Rio de Janeiro 4

References 

2010